Bazdad is a town in the Awaran District of Balochistan province, Pakistan. It is located at 26°20'59N 65°3'2E and has an altitude of 531 metres (1745 feet).

References

Populated places in Awaran District
 rte cok ii